Trevico-Turin: Voyage in Fiatnam is a 1973 Italian drama film, a docufiction written and directed by Ettore Scola. It is a realistic description of the difficult living conditions in which there were Fiat workers immigrants immigrated from the South Italy.

The film blends documentary and fictional cinema, and was funded and produced by Unitelefilm, the film production company of the Italian Communist Party.

Plot
 
From Trevico in the province of Avellino, a young man arrives in Turin to work at Fiat.
Once hired, he will face harsh experiences as an immigrant and a worker.

Cast

 Paolo Turco as Fortunato Santospirito
 Vittoria Franzinetti as Vicky 
 Vittorio Franzinetti 
 Stefania Casini

See also
 List of Italian films of 1973
 Docufiction

References

External links

 

Italian drama films
1973 drama films
1973 films
Films directed by Ettore Scola
Films about immigration
Films scored by Benedetto Ghiglia
 

Docufiction films
Films with screenplays by Ettore Scola
1970s Italian-language films
1970s Italian films